Herbert A.E. Böhme (7 September 1897 – 29 June 1984) was a German film and television actor.

Selected filmography
 The Traitor (1936)
 Ein Mädchen geht an Land (1938)
 Pour le Mérite (1938)
 Legion Condor (1939)
 Ein Robinson (1940)
 Riding for Germany (1941)
 Above All Else in the World (1941)
 Fritze Bollmann wollte angeln (1943)
 Die heimlichen Bräute (1944)
 Kolberg (1945)
 I'll Never Forget That Night (1949)
 Dreizehn unter einem Hut (1950)
 Only One Night (1950)
 The Guilt of Doctor Homma (1951)
 Der Weg zu Dir (1952)
 Elephant Fury (1953)
 Winter in the Woods (1956)
 Captain Falcon (1958)
 Knight of 100 Faces (1960)
 Mill of the Stone Women (1960)
 The Puzzle of the Red Orchid (1962)

External links
 
 http://www.cyranos.ch/smboeh-e.htm

1897 births
1984 deaths
Actors from Wrocław
People from the Province of Silesia
German male film actors
German male television actors
20th-century German male actors